The 2010 Men's Hockey Champions Trophy was the 32nd edition of the Hockey Champions Trophy men's field hockey tournament. It was held from July 31–August 8, 2010 in Mönchengladbach, Germany.

Teams
Below is the teams released by the International Hockey Federation, based on criteria:

 (host and 2008 Olympics gold medalist)
 (Defending champion)
 (Winner of Champions Challenge I)
 (Third in 2010 World Cup)
 (Fourth in 2010 World Cup)
 (Fifth in 2010 World Cup)

Squads

Head coach: Graham Reid

Head coach: Bobby Crutchley

Head coach: Markus Weise

Head coach: Paul van Ass

Head coach: Darren Smith

Head coach: Daniel Martín

Results
All times are Central European Summer Time (UTC+02:00)

Pool

Classification

Fifth and sixth place

Third and fourth place

Final

Awards

Statistics

Final standings

Goalscorers

References

External links
 

Champions Trophy (field hockey)
Champions Trophy
Men's Hockey Champions Trophy
2010
Sport in Mönchengladbach
Hockey Champions Trophy Men
Hockey Champions Trophy Men
21st century in Mönchengladbach